Ireland and Samoa have played each other on seven occasions with Ireland winning six and Samoa winning one. 

Samoa achieved their only victory over Ireland in a five try effort at Landsdowne road in 1996. This was the first rugby international to be played under the floodlights at Lansdowne. It was described by the Irish media as an humiliation, but a well deserved victory for the Samoans.

Excluding "A" side tours, Ireland's only trip to Samoa occurred during their 2003 South Seas tour. Ronan O'Gara's tally of 32 points including two tries, two conversions, a drop goal, and five penalties, remains an Irish record for most points scored in a single match. Notably, 35°C heat forced Jonathan Bell and new cap Anthony Horgan off the pitch with sun-stroke. The Irish ran out comfortable winners 14–40.

Ireland's comfortable 40–9 win during the 2013 November internationals, marked Joe Schmidt's first match as Ireland manager. In this match Brian O'Driscoll and Gordon D'Arcy equalled the New Zealand duo Ma'a Nonu and Conrad Smith's world-record 51-Test centre partnership.

The two sides met at the Rugby World Cup for the first time during their final Pool A group stage match at the 2019 Rugby World Cup. Ireland booked their place in the quarter-finals with seven-try win, despite playing over half the match with 14 men following Bundee Aki's 29th minute red card. Aki is a Kiwi of Samoan heritage who qualified to play for Ireland through residency.

Summary
Note: Summary below reflects test results by both teams.

Overview

Records 
Note: Date shown in brackets indicates when the record was or last set.

Attendance
Up to date as of 13 March 2023

Results

XV Results
Below is a list of matches that the United States has awarded matches test match status by virtue of awarding caps, but Ireland did not award caps. The Ireland A national rugby union team played Samoa on their 1997 Ireland rugby union tour of Oceania in June 1997, while the best Irish players where involved in the 1997 British Lions tour to South Africa. The exhausted Irish development side were torn apart by the ruthless Samoan attack, allowing over a half-century in front a capacity crowd at Apia Park.

References

Ireland national rugby union team matches
Samoa national rugby union team matches